Syntin is a hydrocarbon with the molecular formula C10H16 used as a rocket fuel.  It is a mixture of four stereoisomers (see below). It has a density of 0.851 g/mL, and a boiling point of 158 °C.  Due to the presence of three strained cyclopropane rings, the molecule has a highly positive enthalpy of formation: ΔfH°(l)= 133 kJ/mol  (980 kJ/kg, the average value for the isomeric mixture), bringing additional energy into the combustion process. It has advantages over the traditional hydrocarbon fuels, such as RP-1, due to higher density, lower viscosity and higher specific heat of oxidation.

Syntin was used in the Soviet Union and later Russia as fuel for the Soyuz-U2 rocket from 1982 until 1995.

It was first synthesized in the USSR in 1959 and brought to mass production in the 1970s.  It was prepared in a multi-step synthetic process from easily obtained acetylcyclopropane (the 3rd molecule):

After dissolution of the USSR, the production of this fuel was halted due to the expense of the synthesis. On September 3rd 1995, Soyuz TM-22, the seventy-first and last Soyuz-U2 rocket launched, being the last rocket fueled with Syntin.

Stereoisomers  
Syntin has two stereocenters at the central cyclopropane ring. Thus, four stereoisomers exist:

In practice, syntin is used as a racemic mixture (a mixture where all stereoisomers are present in equal amounts).

See also
Dicyclopentadiene

References

Literature 
 A. P. Mesheheryakov,  V. G. Glukhovtsev, A. D.  Petrov, “Synthesis of 1-methyl-1,2-dicyclopropylcyclopropane”, Doklady Akademii Nauk SSSR, 1960, 130, 779-81.
 Yu. P. Semenov, B. A. Sokolov, S. P. Chernykh, A. A. Grigor'ev, O. M. Nefedov, N. N. Istomin, G. M. Shirshov, “Multiple strained-ring alkane as high-performance liquid rocket fuel”,  RU 2233385, C2 20040727.
 T. Edwards, “Liquid Fuels and Propellants for Aerospace Propulsion: 1903-2003”, Journal of Propulsion and Power, 2003, 19(6), 1089-1107.
 V. Azov, D. Vorontsov, "The last battle of hydrocarbons?", Novosti Kosmonavtiki, 2008, 18, No. 2 (301), 44-46.

Hydrocarbons
Rocket fuels
Cyclopropanes
Substances discovered in the 1960s
Soviet inventions